Portugal is a country on the Iberian Peninsula in Southwestern Europe. It is the westernmost country of mainland Europe. Portugal is a developed country with a high-income advanced economy and a high living standard. It is the 5th most peaceful country in the world, maintaining a unitary semi-presidential republican form of government. It has the 18th highest Social Progress in the world, putting it ahead of other Western European countries like France, Spain and Italy. A founding member of NATO and the Community of Portuguese Language Countries, it is also a member of numerous other international organizations, including the United Nations, the European Union, the eurozone, and the OECD.

For further information on the types of business entities in this country and their abbreviations, see "Business entities in Portugal".

Notable firms 
This list includes notable companies with primary headquarters located in the country. The industry and sector follow the Industry Classification Benchmark taxonomy. Organizations which have ceased operations are included and noted as defunct.

See also 
 List of airlines of Portugal
 List of supermarket chains in Portugal

References 

 
Portugal